Jingtai County is a county in the middle of Gansu Province, bordering Inner Mongolia to the north. It is under the administration of Baiyin City and located at its northwest end. Its postal code is 730400, and its population as of the 2010 Chinese Census was 225,755 people, which the county government reports has grown to about 238,900 as of 2019.

It is located at the junction of Gansu, Ningxia, and Inner Mongolia. Historically, it was a military hub, a vital communication center on the Silk Road, an important ferry, and also a major transit route to Hexi, Xinjiang, Ningxia, and Inner Mongolia. Since 1933, the name of the county has been Jingtai, which means "prosperity of the scene, peace of the country and the people".

The county is home to a number of prominent tourist sites, such as the Yellow River Stone Forest, Yongtai Fortress, and other locations.

History 
During the late Qin and early Han dynasty, the early belonged to the Xiongnu after they exiled the Yuezhi people. Later in the Han dynasty, Emperor Xuan established  in present-day Jingtai County, which later evolved into the ancient city of Diaogou. During the mid-8th century, the area was controlled by the Tibetan Empire. The area would later fall under the control of the Western Xia. In the late 15th and early 16th century, the area was ruled by the Tatars. In 1739, an administrator was sent by the Qing dynasty Emperor Qianlong to the region to manage local affairs. In 1757, Qing officials constructed a fort known as Hongshuibao.

People's Republic of China 
On September 12, 1949, the People's Liberation Army gained control of Jingtai County.

On April 4, 1958, Jingtai County was abolished and merged into Gaolan County. Shortly after, on December 20, 1958, Gaolan County was abolished and merged into the city of Baiyin. On November 15, 1961, Jingtai County was re-established under the jurisdiction of Baiyin.

From October 1963 to August 1985, Jingtai County was placed under the city of Wuwei, but was subsequently restored to Baiyin, which it remains part of today.

Administrative divisions
Jingtai is divided into 8 towns and 3 townships:
Towns

Townships

Climate

Economy
As of 2019, Jingtai County had a gross domestic product totaling ¥5.587 billion, and consumer retail sales totaling ¥2.02 billion. That year, the annual per capita disposable income of the county's urban residents totaled ¥28,264, and reached ¥11,719 for the county's rural residents. The county's primary sector comprises about 29% of Jingtai's gross domestic product, the secondary sector comprises about 25%, and the tertiary sector comprises about 46%.

Jingtai has 385 million tons in gypsum reserves, the second-largest amount in China. The county also has over 800 million tons of limestone, 380 million tons of coal, over 20 million tons of quartz, over 2 million tons of copper, and in addition some reserves of gold, silver, manganese, Moyu (black) jade, clay, and serpentine.

Agriculture

Geographical location and special irrigation system provide Jingtai County with unique conditions for agricultural development. The county is home to the Jingtaichuan Electric Power Lifting Irrigation Project, which is the largest in all of China, and in Asia. There are two large-scale, nationwide noted, irrigation projects with a total capacity of 245,600 kW and a water lifting capacity of 28.6 m³ per second.

The whole county has arable land of over 680  square kilometers and irrigated lands of nearly 400 square kilometers. Located at 37 degrees north latitude, Jingtai County experiences long hours of light and a large temperature difference between day and night. Crops grown in Jingtai include wheat, corn, pears, melons and apricot.

The special agricultural products mainly include desert wolfberry, pear, red date, Dajie apricot, apple, small grains, desert melon, Gobi fish, shrimp, crab, licorice, sheep. Among these products, "Jingtai wolfberry", "Tiaoshan pear", "Longwan apple", and "Cuiliu mutton" have obtained the certification for national agricultural product geographical indication.

A total of 62 products meets the "san pin yi biao" (three types of products and the agricultural product geographical indication) and 47 products are considered as ‘green’, pollution-free, non-toxic, safe, and high-quality food.

Industry 
Jingtai County's main industrial products include main industrial products, cement, calcium carbide, and ferroalloys. Other significant industrial products include ferro-silicon, malt, livestock feed, powdered gypsum, and coal.

Tourism
Jingtai county is home to the following touristic sites:

Yellow River Stone Forest 

Yellow River Stone Forest is located in the southeast of Jingtai County,  from the county's urban center. It gained international prominence after the Gansu ultramarathon disaster, in which 21 runners died from hypothermia, happened there in May 2021.

Its landform is termed an "alluvial sandstone fenglin" (砂砾岩峰林). Fenglin, short for fenglin karst, is "a karst with isolated hills rising from a plain". Stone forest (石林) in Chinese refers to pinnacle-shaped karst, such as the ones in the Yellow River Stone Forest.

The action of neotectonic movements, rain and flood erosions and gravitational collapse forms this peak cluster landscape with vertical and sharply contoured rock strata. It is a popular tourist attraction.

Yongtai Fortress 
It is also called Yongtai tortoise city because of its tortoise-like castle. It a representative and well preserved military castle of Ming Dynasty along the Silk Road. Historically, the castle is an important part of the Ming Great Wall, which is built as a border defense system. Yongtai Fortress now serves as a national cultural relic, a historical village representing the culture of Gansu Province, and site for the shooting of various movies and television shows.

Shoulushan National Forest Park 
Shoulushan National Forest Park is located at the junction of Gansu, Ningxia and Inner Mongolia.

Great Dunhuang Film and Television City 
The complex includes many ancient buildings, caves, archways, city gate towers, a street imitating Ming Dynasty and Qing Dynasty, artificial lakes, and other natural scenes. Within the film-making studio murals, sculptures, and giant Buddhas are created in the style of Mogao Grottoes in Dunhuang.

 Over 20 kilometers away from the Jingtai County, the Great Dunhuang Film-making Base is on the road that connects Yellow River Stone Forest, Yongtai Fortress and Shoulushan National Forest Park. Convenient transportation and location advantages of natural scenes provide this place with unique conditions for creating films and art work represent Western China.
 In 2004, Chen Jialin, a famous Chinese director, happened to find this red stone mountain on the way to Jingtai County. The strange trend of this mountain with uneven pits and densely distributed caves is similar to Mogao Grottoes in Dunhuang. He decided to copy the Mogao Grottoes here as the location for his TV series The Great Dunhuang.
 In 2005, Jingtai County invested 6 million yuan to build this film-making base.
 In 2006, the Great Dunhuang Film-making Base was listed as a provincial film-making base. More than 60 movies and TV series have been filmed here by 2019.

Culture

Film and TV series 

 Welcome to Shama Town (set in Yongtai Fortress)
 The Myth (set in Yellow River Stone Forest)
 Oh My General (set in Yellow River Stone Forest)
 The Great Dunhuang (set in the Great Dunhuang Film-making Base)

Activities 
Jingtai County has held the Yellow River Stone Forest international hiking race with over tens of thousands of people, the Yellow River Stone Forest culture and tourism festival, Wufo red date festival, and other major events representing unique scenes and agricultural products of Jingtai.

Transport
 China National Highway 338
 G2012 Dingbian–Wuwei Expressway
 G1816 Wuhai–Maqên Expressway (under construction)
 Baotou–Lanzhou railway

See also
 List of administrative divisions of Gansu

References

County-level divisions of Gansu
Baiyin